The Four Seasons is a 35-story,  residential skyscraper completed in 2009 and located in Xitun District, Taichung, Taiwan.  As of February 2021, it is 28th tallest building in Taichung. Designed by the Taiwanese architectural firm Hsuyuan Kuo Architect & Associates, the building was constructed under strict requirements of preventing damage caused by earthquakes and typhoons common in Taiwan.

See also 
 List of tallest buildings in Taiwan
 List of tallest buildings in Taichung

References

2009 establishments in Taiwan
Residential skyscrapers in Taiwan
Skyscrapers in Taichung
Apartment buildings in Taiwan
Residential buildings completed in 2009
Taichung's 7th Redevelopment Zone